La Higuera is a village in Bolivia, where Che Guevara was killed.

La Higuera may also refer to the following places:

 La Higuera, Catamarca, Argentina
 La Higuera, Chile
 Lahiguera, Jaén Province, Andalucía, Spain

See also

 Las Higueras Airport, Río Cuarto, Córdoba Province, Argentina
 Higuera, Cáceres Province, Extremadura, Spain
 Higueras,Castellón Province, Valencian Community, Spain